Newark School District was a school district headquartered in Newark, Arkansas. Its schools included Newark Preschool, Newark Elementary School, and Newark High School.

On July 1, 1990, the Oil Trough School District was dissolved, with portions going to the Newark School District. On July 1, 2004, it merged with the Cord Charlotte School District to form the Cedar Ridge School District.

References

Further reading
Map of predecessor districts:
  (Download)

External links
 

Defunct school districts in Arkansas
2004 disestablishments in Arkansas
School districts disestablished in 2004
Education in Independence County, Arkansas